The 1956 All-Big Seven Conference football team consists of American football players chosen by various organizations for All-Big Seven Conference teams for the 1956 NCAA University Division football season.  The selectors for the 1956 season included the Associated Press (AP) and the United Press (UP).  Players selected as first-team players by both the AP and UP are designated in bold.

All-Big Seven selections

Backs
 Jimmy Hunter, Missouri (AP-1 [QB]; UP-1 [QB])
 Tommy McDonald, Oklahoma (AP-1 [HB]; UP-1 [HB]) (College and Pro Football Halls of Fame)
 Clendon Thomas, Oklahoma (AP-1 [HB]; UP-1 [HB]) (College Football Hall of Fame)
 Jerry Brown, Nebraska (AP-1 [FB])
 John Bayuk, Colorado (UP-1 [FB])

Ends
 Jerry Leahy, Colorado (AP-1; UP-1)
 Wally Merz, Colorado (AP-1; UP-1)

Tackles
 Ed Gray, Oklahoma (AP-1; UP-1)
 Tom Emerson, Oklahoma (AP-1)
 Dick Stapp, Colorado (UP-1)

Guards
 Bill Krisher, Oklahoma (AP-1; UP-1)
 Laverne Torczon, Nebraska (AP-1)
 Ellis Rainsberger, Kansas State  (UP-1)

Centers
 Jerry Tubbs, Oklahoma (AP-1; UP-1) (College Football Hall of Fame)

Key
AP = Associated Press

UP = United Press

See also
1956 College Football All-America Team

References

All-Big Seven Conference football team
All-Big Eight Conference football teams